The Pioneers is an American  silent film and one of the earliest Westerns, having been released by the American Mutoscope and Biograph Company in October 1903. It incorporates part of the footage from Kit Carson, another Western short also released by Biograph in October 1903. Both films were shot on location in the Adirondack Mountains of New York.

Plot
A little girl is captured by a band of Indians and her settler parents killed. Some trappers come upon the bodies and set out in pursuit. They track down and kill all the Indians and free the girl.

References

External links
 
 
 The Pioneers  at silentera.com, with a detailed synopsis from "Biograph promotional materials"

1903 films
1903 Western (genre) films
American black-and-white films
American silent short films
Biograph Company films
Films shot in New York (state)
Films directed by Wallace McCutcheon Sr.
Silent American Western (genre) films
1900s American films